Dr. Amin Hassan Omar Abdullah (born 6 November 1951) was the Minister of State at the Ministry of Culture, Youth and Sports in Sudan. Whilst serving in this post, Abdullah served as the Government of Sudan's Chief negotiator for the Doha Document for Peace in Darfur (DDPD).

Early life
Amin Hassan Omar Abdullah was born on November 6, 1951, in White City in western Sudan and received his university education at the University of Khartoum from 1971 to 1975 School of Political Sciences. He then earned a Ph.D. in political science from the University of Missouri in the United States.

Career
He was a public relations officer for a private company, director of the Office of the Attorney General, Journal of Arabia (press release), deputy editor – the managing editor (Banner), director of Research Center for Social Studies - Khartoum, the secretary general of Ministry of Culture and Information, press counselor to the president of the Republic, at the same time chairman of the board, in the era of National Rescue work and Minister of State, Ministry of Culture and Information, chairman of the board and chairman of the editorial board Casablanca national flags, chairman, National Authority for Television, chairman of the board of directors of communication technology, chairman of the board of directors of telephones to call automation, director general of the Sudanese Radio and Television.

Member
Amin Hassan Omar, a member of: Member of the World Federation of writers and thinkers (Pakistan), chairman of the board of directors of the business property, a member of the Union of Writers Sudan (78–1981 m), a member of the Union of Writers Sudan (85–1989 m), a member of the Union of Journalists, a member and chairman of the Board Department of Television, a member of the Council of the Press and Publications (sessions I and II), a member of the board of directors of the Arabsat satellite 2003–2007, Member of the Technical Committee for the preparation of the 1998 constitution, a member of the National Committee for the preparation of the 1998 constitution, a member of the government delegation for the negotiations, IGAD, member of the art of the Interim Constitution, 2005 Member National Committee of the Interim Constitution, 2005 Member of the government delegation to Mquaodhat Darfur - Abuja, Chairman of the Khartoum international channel, head of the Center for Islam and the modern world, the Director-General of the Sudanese Radio and Television.

References

1951 births
Living people
Government ministers of Sudan
University of Missouri alumni
University of Khartoum alumni